Pere Caselles i Tarrats (1 November 1864 - 28 July 1935) was a Spanish Catalan Modernist architect.

Born at Reus, he studied in Barcelona where he graduated in architecture in 1889. He worked mostly in his native town of Reus, designing civil buildings and private residences. These include the Casa Grau,  Casa Iglesias, Casa Munné, Casa Pinyol,  Casa Querol, Casa Sardà, Casa Tomàs Jordi, Casa Punyet, Casa Seharra, Casa Tarrats  and the  Prat de la Riba public school.

He was assassinated during the early stages of the Spanish Civil War.

External links
Online biography 

1864 births
1935 deaths
People from Reus
Architects from Catalonia
Modernist architects